Bilynda Potter (born 8 January 1971) is an Australian former professional tennis player.

A right-handed player from Sydney, Potter featured twice in the women's doubles main draw at the Australian Open. She had a career best singles ranking of 321 and was ranked as high as 96 in the world in doubles.

ITF finals

Singles: 1 (0–1)

Doubles: 1 (0–1)

References

External links
 
 

1971 births
Living people
Australian female tennis players
Tennis players from Sydney